In military usage, a military asset is a weapon or means of production of weapons or other defensive or offensive devices or capabilities.

Description
Whether a military asset is considered a capital asset, or part of a public infrastructure, is a matter of definition. War planners may deem individuals and other items in war zones and rebel controlled area as military assets and not civilian infrastructure. This can include train lines, water plants, agricultural factories, and medicine supplies.

Tactical imagery is used to find concealed high-value assets like artillery placements, ammo dumps and other logistical sites. Terrain and the proximity to supported units would dictate probable locations of logistical routes, ammo dumps, supply depots and assembly areas. Being that the military by definition embraces uniformity, patterns of emplacement and concealment are targeting by the opposing forces assets (such as artillery and air strikes). The size, shape, and surroundings of items frequently gave away the location of military assets and identifiable targets.

Marilyn Waring argued in the 1980s that under the UN System of National Accounts there was no clear differentiator of investment in public goods versus weaponry, and that this distorted the entire monetary system.  See monetary reform for more on this issue.

See also
 Armed forces (Navy, Air Force, Army and Marines)
 Command (military formation)
 Space geostrategy and the militarisation of space
 Critical infrastructure 
 Hard power and Soft power

Military equipment
Military economics